miR-224 is a family of microRNA precursors found in mammals, including humans. The ~22 nucleotide mature miRNA sequence is excised from the precursor hairpin by the enzyme Dicer.

Function 
miR-224, being located on the X-chromosome, is thought to be active in mammalian ovaries, and possibly responds to TGF beta 1. A target of miR-224 has been predicted to be SMAD4. Experimental evidence has shown that while the SMAD4 mRNA level is unchanged, increased miR-224 expression decreases concentration of SMDA4 protein in murine granulosa cells. This is consistent with post-transcriptional miRNA regulation.

Role in cancer
miR-224 has been noted as the most upregulated microRNA in hepatocellular carcinoma. The same study identified a target of mir-224 as apoptosis-inhibitor 5 (API-5).

miR-224 has also been linked with pancreatic ductal carcinoma, where it is thought to repress CD40 expression in cancer cells.

References 

MicroRNA